Samigue Eman (born March 12, 1981) is a Filipino former professional basketball player. He last played for the Alaska Aces of the Philippine Basketball Association (PBA).

Eman was the 2nd overall draft pick of the Magnolia Beverage Masters in the 2007 PBA draft. In 2004, following his participation in the "Try-Outs ng Bayan" program, the University of Mindanao released Eman to join the Philippine National Men's team RP-Cebuana Lhuillier.

On his first two years and a conference with the San Miguel Beermen, he only played sporadically. But, after being acquired by the Aces during the 2010 PBA Fiesta Conference, he was able to showcase his skills as a rebounder and low-post defender and played more minutes. During the 2011–12 Philippine Cup and part of the Commissioner's Cup, he wore number 33, possibly given permission by Bogs Adornado.

PBA career statistics

Correct as of September 23, 2016

Season-by-season averages
 
|-
| align=left | 
| align=left | Magnolia
| 19 ||	10.8 	 || .633 || .000 || .688 || 3.0 ||	.2 ||	.1 ||	.7 ||	4.4
|-
| align=left | 
| align=left | San Miguel
| 12 ||	6.6 || .500 || .000 || .500 || 1.3 ||	.0 ||	.1 ||	.7 ||	1.1
|-
| align=left | 
| align=left | San Miguel / Alaska
| 42 ||	8.4 || .508 || .000 || .500 || 2.1 ||	.2 ||	.2 ||	.4 ||	2.1
|-
| align=left | 
| align=left | Alaska
| 39 ||	12.1 || .405 || .000 || .538 || 3.8 ||	.4 ||	.1 ||	.9 ||	3.3
|-
| align=left | 
| align=left | Alaska
| 35 ||	9.3 || .405 || .000 || .500 || 2.9 ||	.1 ||	.3 ||	.7 ||	2.4
|-
| align=left | 
| align=left | Alaska
| 28 ||	4.9 || .433 || .000 || .440 || 1.2 ||	.2 ||	.2 ||	.3 ||	1.3
|-
| align=left | 
| align=left | Alaska
| 20 ||	5.9 || .400 || .000 || .455 || 1.6 ||	.1 ||	.1 ||	.4 ||	1.7
|-
| align=left | 
| align=left | Alaska
| 34 ||	7.7 || .314 || .000 || .579 || 1.3 ||	.2 ||	.2 ||	.5 ||	1.3
|-
| align=left | 
| align=left | Alaska
| 17 ||	5.2 || .167 || .000 || .333 || 1.0 ||	.1 ||	.3 ||	.5 ||	.6
|-class=sortbottom
| align=center colspan=2 | Career
| 246 || 8.3 || .424 || .000 || .527 || 2.2 ||	.2 ||	.2 ||	.6 ||	2.1

References 

1982 births
Living people
Alaska Aces (PBA) players
Centers (basketball)
UM Wildcats basketball players
Filipino men's basketball players
San Miguel Beermen players
Basketball players from Davao City
San Miguel Beermen draft picks